Carl-Axel Elfving (12 January 1920 – 12 January 1988) was a Swedish actor. He appeared in more than 70 films and television shows between 1947 and 1986.

Selected filmography
 Don't Give Up (1947)
 Private Bom (1948)
 Teacher's First Born (1950)
 Knockout at the Breakfast Club (1950)
 A Ghost on Holiday (1951)
 Say It with Flowers (1952)
 Dance in the Smoke (1954)
 A Little Nest (1956)
 The Girl in Tails (1956)
 The Stranger from the Sky (1956)
 Encounters in the Twilight (1957)
 The Halo Is Slipping (1957)
 Bill Bergson Lives Dangerously (1957)
 Woman in a Fur Coat (1958)
 Åsa-Nisse in Military Uniform (1958)
 The Judge (1960)
 Lovely Is the Summer Night (1961)
 Hide and Seek (1963)
 Sten Stensson Returns (1963)
 Sailors (1964)
 Här kommer bärsärkarna (1965)
 The Reluctant Sadist (1967)
 Pistol (1973)

References

External links

1920 births
1988 deaths
20th-century Swedish male actors
Swedish male film actors
Swedish male television actors
People from Västernorrland County